Siversk (until 1973: Yama [Я́ма; Я́ма]) is a city in Bakhmut Raion of Donetsk Oblast (province) of Ukraine situated 99 km north of Donetsk.  Population: ; 12,608 (2010).

There are some industrial factories located within the raion, notably the Stroidetal brick factory. Siversk is a former sovhoz by the name of Yamskyi.

History
The town was founded in 1913 because of the operation of the dolomite mine near the railway station of Yama built in 1910. The town received city status in 1961 and was renamed Siversk in 1973.

On 10 July 2014, Ukrainian forces secured the town from pro-Russian separatists.

Battle of Siversk

In July 2022, the city became the site of a battle between forces from Russia and the breakaway DPR and LPR against Ukrainian forces, resulting in the defeat and retreat of Russian forces.

Gallery

Population 
Recent population estimates or census results:

References

 
Cities in Donetsk Oblast
Bakhmut Raion
Populated places established in the Russian Empire